The 1981 Stowe Grand Prix was a men's tennis tournament played on outdoor hard courts at the Topnotch Inn in Stowe, Vermont in the United States that was part of the 1981 Grand Prix circuit. It was the fourth edition of the tournament and was held from August 10 through August 16, 1981. Second-seeded Brian Gottfried won the singles title.

Finals

Singles
 Brian Gottfried defeated  Tony Graham 6–3, 6–3
 It was Gottfried's 1st singles title of the year and the 22nd of his career.

Doubles
 Johan Kriek /  Larry Stefanki defeated  Brian Gottfried/  Bob Lutz 2–6, 6–1, 6–2

References

Stowe Grand Prix
Stowe Grand Prix